is a Shinto shrine on a hill named  in Tennōji-ku, Osaka, Japan. It is notable for being the possible location of a legendary tunnel used during the 17th century Siege of Osaka.

History
The temple is said to have been built in the 5th century CE, during the reign of Emperor Hanzei. In the past it was also known as Himeyama Shrine, but has become more commonly known as the Sanko Shrine of Mt. Sanada. According to the shrine's history, the current head priest is the 86th head in the shrine's lineage.

Grounds
There is a statue of Sanada Yukimura on the grounds in recognition of the belief that the area is the location of the Sanada Maru, a fortification defended by the Toyotomi clan during the 1614 Winter Campaign of the Siege of Osaka. The number of worshippers visiting the shrine has increased dramatically since the shrine has been featured in the 2016 NHK taiga drama Sanada Maru. However, recent research by Yoshihiro Senda, Professor of Archeology and President of Nara University, concluded that the Sanada Maru was likely located several hundred metres away from the shrine. Senda further found that the tunnel on the shrine's grounds is not the legendary passage, but more likely a trench dug by the attacking Maeda forces.

Festivals
In June each year the shrine hosts the "Chūbu-yoke" festival, a week-long festival devoted to warding off the ill effects (e.g. paralysis and numbness) caused by stroke. During the rare event, a ring of grass measuring two metres in height is erected within the temple's hall. After receiving a blessing from the priest, the worshipper steps through the ring while praying for good health and long life.

Access
A small shopping street commonly referred to as the "Tamatsukuri Yukimura Road" leads from Tamatsukuri Station to the shrine. The station is connected to JR West's Osaka Loop Line and the Osaka subway's Nagahori Tsurumi-ryokuchi Line.

Gallery

References

External links

  

Shinto shrines in Osaka